Drina donina, the brown yamfly  is a species of blue butterfly (Lycaenidae) found in Asia.

Range
The butterfly occurs in India in the Lushai hills (Mizoram) and across to the Dawnas in Myanmar. The range extends eastwards to Indochina and southern Thailand, Peninsular Malaysia and Langkawi.

Status
Not rare.

See also
List of butterflies of India (Lycaenidae)

Cited references

References
  
 
 
 
 

Drina (butterfly)
Butterflies of Asia